Gaspard Hons (3 November 1937 – 11 August 2020) was a Belgian poet.

Works
 Le Bréviaire de l'attente (1974)
 Cordages d’haleines (1975)
 Maternité. La transhumance (1976)
 Juin, lampe bleue et feu d’épaules (1976)
 Le jour émigre (1977)
 Dix-sept heures (1978)
 Baccarat dans le texte (1979)
 Auberge de taffetas (1979)
 Voir dire (1982)
 Éternuement en ce lieu (1984)
 Fusil posé à l’ombre des chasseurs (1984)
 Éléments pour une demeure (1985)
 Verger peint (1985)                                                
 Mémoire peinte (1985)
 Chemins (1985)
 Or & grès (1988)
 La Maison de personne (1988)
 Le Poème de personne (1988)
 Or et grès (1988)
 Des poèmes très ordinaires (1991)
 Le Livre de personne (1991)
 La Dernière Montagne (1991)
 Offert aux dieux lointains… (1992)
 Le froid n’atteint pas les pommiers en fleur (1992)
 Personne ne précède (1993)
 Un papillon posé sur un livre de Georges Perec (1993)
 Au seul souci de voyager (1994)
 L’Impossible (1994)
 Signe de la main (1995)
 Bleu là-haut (1995)
 Un nom sous ma langue (1995)
 Le Jardin des morts heureux (1996)
 Dans les failles de la lecture et du silence (1997)
 Noli me tangere (1997)
 La Morale des abattoirs (1997)
 L’Orage en deux: une anthologie poétique, 1974-1996 (1998)
 Visage racinéant (1999)
 Avec un livre sous le bras (1999)
 Le Jardin de Cranach: parcours 1979-1990 (2000)
 Schlamm lumineux (2001)
 L’Écart, la Distance (2001)
 Ly’s light (2002)
 Un grand lieu vide sans vaisseaux (2003)
 La Fleur incréée (2004)
 La Merveille du rien (2004)
 Promenade à Rorschach (2005)
 Propos notés en ramassant des aiguilles de pin (2005)
 Les Abeilles de personne (2008)
 Roses improbables (2009)
 L’Esprit du boeuf (2009)
 Petites proses matinales (2012)
 Roses imbrûlées (2013)
 Le Bel Automne (2014)
 Giordano Bruno et autres proses (2014)
 Quand resplendit la fleur inverse (2014)

Awards
Prix René Gerbault for Auberge de taffetas (1979)
Prix Claude Ardent for Le Voyage précaire (1985)
Prix Maurice et Gisèle Gauchez-Philippot for Mémoire peinte (1987)
Prix de l'Agence de Coopération culturelle et technique for Personne ne précède (1989)
Prix Froissart for Offert aux dieux lointains (1992)
Prix Emma Martin for Le Jardin de Cranach (2001)
Prix Jean Kobs of the Académie royale de langue et de littérature françaises de Belgique for Le Jardin de Cranach (2002)
Prix Louis Guillaume du poème en prose for Propos notés en ramassant des aiguilles de pin (2006)
Prix Robert Goffin for Roses improbables (2008)
Prix Eugène Schmits of the Académie royale de langue et de littérature françaises de Belgique for Les Abeilles de personne (2009)
Prix Lucien Malpertuis of the Académie royale de langue et de littérature françaises de Belgique for his career works (2009)

References

1937 births
2020 deaths
Belgian male poets
People from Kelmis